This is a list of all professional wrestling pay-per-view (PPV) events promoted by the National Wrestling Alliance (NWA) while under the ownership of Billy Corgan's Lightning One. To date all shows have been broadcast on FITE TV.

Pay-per-view events

Past events

2018

2019

2020

2021

2022

2023

Upcoming event schedule

2023

Pop-Up Events

Past events

2019

2021

2022

Upcoming event schedule

See also

List of All Elite Wrestling pay-per-view events
List of FMW supercards and pay-per-view events
List of Global Force Wrestling events and specials
List of Impact Wrestling pay-per-view events
List of Major League Wrestling events
List of NJPW pay-per-view events
List of NWA/WCW closed-circuit events and pay-per-view events
List of Ring of Honor pay-per-view events
List of Smoky Mountain Wrestling supercard events
List of World Class Championship Wrestling supercard events
List of WWA pay-per-view events
List of WCW Clash of the Champions shows
List of WWE pay-per-view and WWE Network events
List of WWE Saturday Night Main Event shows
List of WWE Tribute to the Troops shows

Notes

References

External links
 

Professional wrestling-related lists
National Wrestling Alliance